The rough-scaled python (Morelia carinata) is a large-scaled python species endemic to Australia. No subspecies are currently recognized.

Description
It has a triangular-shaped head with a conspicuous constriction at the neck area. M. carinata is distinguished by the presence of a large parietal scale and by having distinct keeled dorsal scales. The body is slim and muscular. The color pattern is light honey-tan with darker reddish-brown markings or dark brown with pale brown blotches. The blotches become larger toward the tail, so the pattern appears to be reversed. The belly is white, possibly with black spots. The markings are thought to assist in providing camouflage. The wrinkled to corrugated scales also assist the snake in climbing up sandstone and crevices.

The species was first formally identified by biologist L.A. Smith in 1981 as part of the work A revision of the python genera Aspidites and Python (Serpentes: Boidae) in Western Australia as published in the Records of the Western Australian Museum.

Captivity
They are now available to private owners, originating from a few wild-caught specimens, as they were found to breed readily in captivity.

Three males and two females were collected and transferred to the Australian Reptile Park in 2000 and had produced 71 offspring by 2012. These, in turn, had produced another offspring.

Distribution and habitat
These snakes are found in Australia, in northwestern Western Australia in the lower sections of the Mitchell and Hunter Rivers, just inland from the coast. The type locality given is "Mitchell River Falls, Western Australia (14°50'S, 125°42'E)" [Australia].

They are found in rocky valleys of Kimberley region in far northern Western Australia, where they climb on low trees and shrubs of monsoon rainforest. The species has one of the smallest distributions of any snake. They are present in the Charnley River–Artesian Range Wildlife Sanctuary in the Kimberley region.

The species is often associated with fruit-bearing trees, possibly indicating a preference of ambush sites for herbivorous animals, and also close to permanent fresh water.

Behavior
So far, they are reported to be strictly crepuscular. Their temperament is quite docile with rarely any attempts to bite.

Reproduction
This species is confirmed to be an egg-layer (oviparous) like other pythons. The mating season is between July and August. Females usually lay around ten eggs and coils about them providing warmth until they hatch. Once the eggs do hatch the female does not take care of the young.

Media
This species was only filmed for the first time by wildlife conservationist Malcolm Douglas, and shown on his Kimberley Adventure Part 1. (1997)

References

Further reading
 Smith, L.A. 1981. A Revision of the Python Genera Aspidites and Python (Serpentes: Boidae) in Western Australia. Rec. West. Australian Mus. 9 (2): 211-226. ("Python carinatus sp. nov.", pp. 220–222, Figures 5 & 6.)

External links
 

Morelia (snake)
Reptiles described in 1981
Reptiles of Western Australia
Snakes of Australia